Synodus falcatus is a species of lizardfish that lives mainly in the eastern central Pacific Ocean.

Environment
Synodus falcatus is native to a subtropical climate. They are commonly found in a benthic depth range of about 65 – 115 meters.

Identification
Synodus falcatus is identified by its rose color or an orangish-brown color.

Distribution
Synodus falcatus is recorded to reside in the areas of Eastern Central Pacific and Hawaii.

Size
Synodus falcatus is known to reach the maximum recorded length of about 14.5 centimeters or about 5.7 inches.

References

Synodontidae
Fish described in 1989